Raymond Bernard William White (13 August 1918 – 1988) was an English professional footballer who played for Tottenham Hotspur and Bradford Park Avenue.

Playing career
White, an amateur played in one FA Cup match for the Spurs in 1946. The wing half joined Bradford Park Avenue in May 1946 and went on to make 151 appearances and net three goals between 1946 and 1951.

References

1918 births
1988 deaths
Sportspeople from Bootle
English footballers
English Football League players
Tottenham Hotspur F.C. players
Bradford (Park Avenue) A.F.C. players
Association football wing halves